Timothy J. Callahan is an associate professor of geology and environmental geosciences at the College of Charleston in South Carolina. He is director of the college's Master of Environmental Studies program and has interests in hydrogeology, wetlands and water resources.

Education
Callahan holds a Ph.D. in earth and environmental science (2001) and an M.S. in geochemistry from the New Mexico Institute of Mining and Technology (1995), as well as a B.A. in geology from the University of St. Thomas, St. Paul, Minnesota (1991).

Environmental science
Callahan is a member of the American Geophysical Union, the Carolina Geological Society, the Geological Society of America and the Society of Wetland Scientists. He co-authored three papers on hydrology for the 2008 South Carolina Water Resources Conference and has co-authored several other peer-reviewed articles published in the Journal of the American Water Resource Association, the Journal of Geoscience Education, the Journal of Contaminant Hydrology and elsewhere.

References

College of Charleston faculty
American hydrologists
American geophysicists
University of St. Thomas (Minnesota) alumni
New Mexico Institute of Mining and Technology alumni
Living people
Year of birth missing (living people)